Cangetta micralis is a moth in the family Crambidae. It is found in South America, the Caribbean (including Jamaica) and in southern Florida.

The larvae feed on the buds and flowers of Palicourea rigida in Brazil.

References

Moths described in 1907
Spilomelinae